Orthosimyia is a genus of bristle flies in the family Tachinidae.

Species
Orthosimyia montana Reinhard, 1944
Orthosimyia palaga Reinhard, 1944

Distribution
United States.

References

Dexiinae
Diptera of North America
Tachinidae genera